Folashade Alice Oluwafemiayo (born 11 March 1985) is a Nigerian Paralympian athlete.

Personal life 
Oluwafemiayo was born in Jos, and she is married to a male paralympic, with whom she has a child.

Career 
In 2012, Oluwafemiayo won silver medal in the women's 75kg category at the 2012 Summer Paralympics, breaking the world record in the process. She also won gold medal at the 2017 World Para Powerlifting Championships in Mexico. However, she was suspended a year later for breaking anti-doping laws.

In 2021, she won the gold medal in her event at the 2021 World Para Powerlifting Championships held in Tbilisi, Georgia. At this event, she also set a new world record of 152.5 kg.

She competed at the 2022 Commonwealth Games where she won a gold medal in the heavyweight event.

References

External links
 

1985 births
Living people
Sportspeople from Jos
Paralympic medalists in powerlifting
Paralympic gold medalists for Nigeria
Paralympic silver medalists for Nigeria
Medalists at the 2012 Summer Paralympics
Medalists at the 2020 Summer Paralympics
Powerlifters at the 2012 Summer Paralympics
Powerlifters at the 2020 Summer Paralympics
20th-century Nigerian women
21st-century Nigerian women
Powerlifters at the 2022 Commonwealth Games
Commonwealth Games gold medallists for Nigeria
Commonwealth Games medallists in powerlifting
Medallists at the 2022 Commonwealth Games